Boze Hadleigh (born May 15, 1954), sometimes writing as George Hadley-Garcia, is an author. Several of his books cover LGBT culture, popular culture, and show business. His 22 books have been translated into 14 languages.

Writings
Several of his books deal with pop culture and/or entertainment history and how the media and status quo shape and manipulate audiences' perceptions and opinions. Some of his books are exclusively about the LGBT presence in and contributions to entertainment.

Some of Hadleigh's books are quotes collections, some are histories and overviews, and some are interviews with movie personalities. Several of these interviews, as with Rock Hudson, were published in periodicals before the subjects died.

Life
Boze Hadleigh was born on May 15, 1954, in Syria. He holds a master's degree in journalism. Hadleigh is gay.

Bibliography
 
  (also published as Celluloid Gaze)
Conversations with My Elders (republished as Celluloid Gaze) includes interviews with actors Sal Mineo and Rock Hudson; directors George Cukor, Luchino Visconti, and Rainer Werner Fassbinder; and designer, photographer, and author Cecil Beaton. Their conversations with the author reveal much about the lives and careers of these celebrities and how their homosexuality affected both.
 
  (also published as Sing Out!)
  (UK only)
 
 
 
Hollywood Lesbians is a collection of interviews with 10 lesbians in the entertainment industry. Publishers Weekly wrote: "Fans of Hollywood's golden age will find this collection of interviews conducted over many years revealing, though hampered. The subjects - director Dorothy Arzner, designer Edith Head, actresses Judith Anderson, Marjorie Main, Barbara Stanwyck, Nancy Kulp, Capucine, Patsy Kelly, Agnes Moorehead and Sandy Dennis — were raised in a generation terrified of voicing support for fellow homosexuals, let alone daring to come out of the closet to acknowledge their own sexuality... Still, with carefully couched questions from Hadleigh (Conversations with My Elders), though some of the respondents dance around the subjects of sex and sexuality. Still, an enlightening picture emerges of Tinseltown, different from that presented in the fanzines."
 
Hollywood Gays is a collection of interviews with prominent film personalities, such as Liberace, Anthony Perkins, Randolph Scott, and several others, most of them widely known as homosexual. Publishers Weekly said about the book: "Hadleigh (is) evidently taking up where the great gossip columnists of yesteryear left off." The book includes an interview with producer David Lewis, who talks freely about his longtime companion James Whale, as well as a conversation with William Haines, whose career was destroyed by Louis B. Mayer after Haines refused to marry a woman, and was later caught with another man in his cot at a YMCA.
 
  (published in the UK as Hollywood Bitch)
 
 
 
 
 
 
 
 
 
 
 In or Out: Gay & Straight Celebs Talk About Themselves & Each Other is a compilation of celebrity quotes from stars who comment on themselves, their sexuality, on others, on the closet, and on society's homophobia, as well as that of show business.
 The Lavender Screen: The Gay and Lesbian Films — Their Stars, Makers, Characters, and Critics is an illustrated overview of LGBT-themed films, most of them starring heterosexual actors in the lead gay, lesbian or bisexual roles, such as Robin Williams in The Birdcage.  It was updated and re-released in 2001.
The Vinyl Closet: Gays and Lesbians in the Music World focuses on present and past gay, lesbian and bisexual singers, composers, musicians and dancers in North America and Britain, with a foreword by Leonard Bernstein, and is one of the first books that document their artistic contributions. According to Madonna, it "cuts through the role-playing crap and shows the music world as it really ... is! It's camp with a High-C!"

References

External links
The Boze Hadleigh interview of Sal Mineo.

1954 births
Living people
Place of birth missing (living people)
American biographers
American male biographers
American male journalists
LGBT Hispanic and Latino American people
American gay writers
People from Beverly Hills, California
Celebrity biographers
Journalists from California
Jeopardy! contestants
21st-century LGBT people